Marambadi is a village in Vedasandur taluk, Dindigul district, Tamil Nadu, India. It has a population of 5,571 per the 2001 national census. The village has several schools and bus service to Dindigul and Vedasandur.

Demographics
According to the 2001 national census, Marambadi has a population of 5,571 with a roughly equal proportion of males and females.

Education
Per the 2001 census, Marambadi has six primary schools, three middle schools, one secondary school and one senior secondary school.

Transport
As of 2013, the Tamil Nadu State Transport Corporation operates a bus service routed Dindigul–Marambadi–Vedasandur.

References

Villages in Dindigul district